Giannis Iatroudis (Greek: Γιάννης Ιατρούδης; born 2 February 1999) is a Greek professional footballer who plays as a winger or a second striker for Super League 2 club Chania.

Career

Ergotelis
Iatroudis came through the youth system of Ergotelis, and made his senior debut against Panserraikos on the first matchday of the 2017–18 Greek Football Cup. He managed to impress during his first season with the club in the 2017–18 Greek Football League tournament, with 3 goals in 22 appearances, mostly as a substitute.

Iatroudis maintained his good form during the next season, scoring twice during the first match of the club's new season against Ermis Amyntaio in the 2018–19 Greek Cup. He added a third goal to his tally in the competition on the second matchday of the group stage, equalizing for his side during a tough 1–2 home loss against title holders PAOK. He was instrumental in Ergotelis' impressive campaign to the Cup quarter-finals (their first since 1986), scoring against all Superleague opponents faced by the club before being overpowered by Asteras Tripolis 5–1 on aggregate (Iatroudis having scored the single Ergotelis goal). He eventually finished as competition top-scorer. His performances were rewarded with his first call-up for the Greek national under-21 team.

AEK Athens
On 7 August 2020, after 15 years with Ergotelis, Iatroudis joined Super League giants AEK Athens on a four-year contract.

Loan to Volendam
On 2 October 2020, Iatroudis signed a long season contract with Volendam, on loan from AEK Athens.

Career statistics

Honours

Individual
Football League Best Young Player Award: 2018−19
Greek Cup Top goalscorer: 2018–19

References

External links

1999 births
Living people
Greek expatriate footballers
Football League (Greece) players
Ergotelis F.C. players
Association football forwards 
Association football midfielders
Footballers from Heraklion
Greek footballers
Greece under-21 international footballers
AEK Athens F.C. B players
Greek expatriate sportspeople in the Netherlands
Expatriate footballers in the Netherlands
FC Volendam players